Germán Picó Cañas (1905–1988) was a Chilean lawyer, businessman and politician. He was born in Santiago on May 25, 1905 and died in that same city on July 12, 1988. He was a member of the Radical Party of Chile. Among the positions he held include that of finance minister under President Gabriel González Videla.

Education and career
He studied at the Instituto Nacional General José Miguel Carrera of Santiago and then graduated as a lawyer at the Universidad de Chile (1931).

He joined the Radical Party and, during the government of Gabriel González Videla was finance minister twice; for half a year in 1947 and then from 1951 to 1952). He was also vice president of the Corporation for Economic Development Agency, CORFO.

Between the two ministries in 1949, at the request of Gonzalez Videla, he acquired, along with Raúl Jaras, the rights to the shares of La Hora newspaper, which in fact belonged to the Radical Party, but which was virtually bankrupt. Efforts to clean up the newspaper failed, so Picó and Jaras decided to take out an evening paper, La Tercera de la Hora, which appeared on 7 July 1950. Pico was, in fact, the one who had control of the newspaper.

In 1954 he was elected president of the National Press Association, a position he held until 1975. As an entrepreneur, he also led the Association of Industrial Metal and Metal Mechanics, Asimet.

In 1969 he was, along with Julio Durán, among those who divided the Radical Party to form the Radical Democratic Party and supported the candidacy of Jorge Alessandri in the 1970 presidential election.

In 1985 he was with Sergio Onofre Jarpa, one of the founders of the National Labour Front and two years later, in 1987 he was one of the founding members of Renovación Nacional.

He died in Santiago, Chile on July 12, 1988.

Chilean politicians
University of Chile alumni
People from Santiago
1905 births
1988 deaths
20th-century Chilean lawyers